Kristīne Giržda (born 7 January 1993) is a Latvian footballer who plays for Rīgas FS as a forward.

She previously played for Liepājas Metalurgs. With the Latvian national team she has taken part in the 2013 Euro and 2015 World Cup's qualifiers.

References

1993 births
Living people
Latvian women's footballers
Women's association football forwards
Rīgas FS players
FC Skonto/Cerība-46.vsk. players
Latvia women's youth international footballers
Latvia women's international footballers